The Railroad Avenue Historic District is a historic district listed on the National Register of Historic Places in Las Vegas, New Mexico. It encompasses three blocks of Railroad Avenue between Jackson Street and University Avenue, as well as the first block of Lincoln Avenue. The buildings in the district were directly related to the presence of the Atchison, Topeka and Santa Fe Railway in Las Vegas and date from between 1879 and 1920.

Notable buildings

References

New Mexico State Register of Cultural Properties
National Register of Historic Places in San Miguel County, New Mexico
Historic districts on the National Register of Historic Places in New Mexico